Mahmoud Fekri Juybari (born July 26, 1969, in Juybar, Iran) is a former Iranian football player and coach who is now head coach of Saipa in Azadegan League.
He was previously head coach of Shirin Faraz, Nassaji and Esteghlal. He usually played the defender position.

Club career and managerial career statistics 
 Last Update: August 30, 2010

Managerial Statics

International career
He was also a member of Iran national football team until November 15, 2006, when he officially retired from International football after a 2–0 victory against South Korea.

Honours

Player
Esteghlal
Iranian Football League (3): 1997–98, 2000–01, 2005–06
Hazfi Cup (3): 1995–96, 1999–00, 2001–02
Asian Club Championship runner-up : 1998-99
Asian Club Championship third place : 2001-02

Manager
Naft Masjed Soleyman
Azadegan League (1): 2017–18

References

External links

1969 births
Living people
Iranian footballers
Esteghlal F.C. players
Shirin Faraz Kermanshah players
Iran international footballers
Asian Games gold medalists for Iran
Asian Games medalists in football
Footballers at the 1998 Asian Games
People from Juybar
Association football defenders
Medalists at the 1998 Asian Games
Esteghlal F.C. managers
F.C. Nassaji Mazandaran managers
Shahin Bushehr F.C. managers
Sportspeople from Mazandaran province
Persian Gulf Pro League managers